The Bridge is the fifteenth studio album by British singer-songwriter Sting, released on 19 November 2021 through A&M Records. It is his first rock-oriented album since 2016's 57th & 9th. The album marks the return of Branford Marsalis on saxophone and clarinet, as well as Manu Katché on drums.

Background
Sting wrote the album "in a year of global pandemic, personal loss, separation, disruption, lockdown and extraordinary social and political turmoil".

Singles
"If It's Love", the first single from the album, was released on 1 September 2021.

Reception

Lakshmi Govindrajan Javeri of Firstpost wrote "Sting's new release The Bridge has a strong pop-rock vibe that defined his Police and early solo years, but some of its best songs have Celtic and jazz influences."  Mark Kennedy of the Associated Press wrote "The Bridge is a moody and varied collection in an unmoored time, with nods to Scripture, ancient allegories, and malevolent characters. It's a strong album from a singer-songwriter who sees warning signs ahead." Fiona Shepherd of The Scotsman wrote "Sting is also in sprightly mood on The Bridge, whistling along on the blithe single If It's Love, as decent a pop tune as he has produced in some time. This lockdown production nods to his diverse musical tastes, from mellow roots track The Book of Numbers with its plangent bass twang to the slick soaring saxophone (from Branford Marsalis no less) on Harmony Road to the fiddle flourish of Captain Bateman, which is revisited as a jazzy scat bonus track called Captain Bateman’s Basement." John Shand at The Sydney Morning Herald says that the album has Sting "bundling up his established interests in pop, R&B, folk and a dash of jazz – which could also be described as treading musical water", and describes Sting as "an artist who still sounds in his prime."  Michael Gallucci of Ultimate Classic Rock describes the album as "Sting's least fussy and most satisfying album in years."

Track listing

Personnel  
Sting: Vocals, bass 
Dominic Miller: Guitars
Martin Kierszenbaum: Keyboards
Frédéric Renaudin: Synthesizer
Branford Marsalis: Saxophone, clarinet
Manu Katché, Josh Freese: Drums
Gene Noble, Jo Lawry, Laila Biali, Melissa Musique: Backing vocals

Charts

Weekly charts

Year-end charts

References

2021 albums
Albums impacted by the COVID-19 pandemic
Sting (musician) albums
A&M Records albums